Planeat is a 2010 British documentary film by Or Shlomi and Shelley Lee Davies. The film discusses the possible nutritional and environmental benefits of adopting a whole foods, plant-based diet based on the research of T. Colin Campbell, Caldwell Esselstyn and Gidon Eshel. The film also features the views of Peter Singer.

According to Shelley Lee Davies, the film purposely does not cover any purported animal rights arguments (as opposed to animal welfare) for adopting a plant-based (vegan) diet, but concentrates on the health and environmental reasons instead.

Planeat premiered at the 2010 Newport Beach Film Festival. It released theatrically in the United States in April 2011 and the United Kingdom in May 2011. The film was privately screened by the film's directors and Willie Bain MP at Somerset House in March 2011 and in the House of Commons in May 2011.

Critical reception
Jamie Russell of Total Film gave it 4 stars out of 5 and called it “Punchy and inspirational” and "Forceful stuff, though we can take or leave the kale sandwiches."

Jennie Kermode of Eye For Film gave it 4 stars out of 5 and praised the cinematography “For fans of cookery programmes it is likely to be love at first sight. Bright, crisp cinematography perfectly captures a dazzling array of beautifully prepared foods which one can almost smell”

Cath Clarke of The Guardian gave the movie 2 stars out of 5 and, speaking as a vegetarian convert, speculated on her reasons for disliking the film: "Maybe it's the tippy-toe, softly-softly tone, sprinkling inspiration between the science, with visits to boutique organic farms and kooky vegan cupcake bakeries. Possibly it ought to come with a warning: contains traces of smugness."

Charlotte O'Sullivan of the London Evening Standard writes, "PlanEat is on a serious mission but its lack of focus is infectious. My big question as the credits rolled: why are so many vegan chefs covered in tattoos?"

Christopher Long of Movie Metropolis gave the movie a 5 out of 10 saying, "a movie by true believers for true believers, and I am not one."

Awards and Festivals
The Jury Selection, UK Green Film Festival Award
FICMA, Barcelona International Environmental Film Festival
London International Documentary Film Festival
Newport Beach Film Festival
Environmental Film Festival in the Nation's Capital
European Documentary Film Festival
Melbourne Environmental Film Festival
Slow Motion Food Film Festival, Nova Scotia
Tutti Nello Stesso Piatto Festival, Italy 
Ecocup Moscow Film Festival
Do Something Reel Film Festival
Raindance Film Festival
Oneonta Film Festival
Cinema Verde Environmental Film and Arts Festival

See also
 List of vegan media

References

External links
 
 
 

2010 films
British documentary films
Vegetarianism in the United Kingdom
2010s English-language films
2010s British films
Documentary films about plant-food diets